Matthew Fink is a South-African record producer, sound engineer, and musician.

Discography 
Fink has produced the following artists (incomplete list)
 2005: Jim Neversink – Jim Neversink (Ent Entertainment); has Fink on accordion and guitar
 2006: Unspoken - Laurie Levine (Independent)
 2007: Beautiful Mornings (EP) - The Black Hotels
 2008: Shakey Is Good'''– Jim Neversink (Radio Lava) 
 2009: Films for the next century - The Black Hotels (independent release); with Fink on keyboards 
 2011: Honey Badger - The Black Hotels (Sovereign Entertainment); with Fink on Keyboards
 2011: Tale of the Son - Tale of the Son (Deconstruction Recordings 2011) 
 2011: Guns and Money - Shadowclub (Just Music)
 2012: Songs from the Edge of the World - The One Night Stands (Sting Music)
 2012: The Dark Horse - Tailor (Just Music)
 2013 Abraham (EP) - Nakhane Touré (Just Music) 
 2013 The Home We Built- Matthew Mole (Just Music)
 2013 Brave Confusion- Nakhane Toure (Just Music)
 2014 Trouble- The Anti Retro Vinyls (Just Music) 
 2015 Serpente Masjien- Sannie Fox (Just Music) 
2015 We're Still Running - Van T (Just Music) 
 2016 "Let Me In" (Single) - Ramdaz (Just Music) - Co-Producer
 2017 "Butterflies" (Single) - Bianca Blanc (Just Music)
 2017 "Lost" (Single) - Ramdaz (Just Music) - Co-Producer
 2018 My Soul Got Stranger- Sannie Fox (Just Music)
 2018 Bianca Blanc''- Bianca Blanc (Just Music)
 2019 "Come With Me" (Single) - Ramdaz (Just Music) - Co-Producer

References

South African record producers
Living people
Year of birth missing (living people)